John Kelly (c. 1793 – 17 September 1854) was a Manx advocate who became High Bailiff of Castletown and a Member of the House of Keys.

Biography
Born and raised on the Isle of Man, John Kelly pursued a career in the legal profession following his schooling. He was appointed High Bailiff of Castletown by the Isle of Man's Lieutenant Governor, Cornelius Smelt, on August 17, 1832.
As a magistrate Kelly was said to of been judicious, impartial and highly competent.

Death 
John Kelly died at his home in Castletown, Isle of Man on Saturday September 17, 1854, following a short illness.
Following Kelly's death he was succeeded as High Bailiff of Castletown by Sir James Gell.

References

1793 births
1854 deaths
Manx judges
Manx politicians